Kamianki-Czabaje  is a village in the administrative district of Gmina Przesmyki, within Siedlce County, Masovian Voivodeship, in east-central Poland.

The village has a population of 200.

References

Kamianki-Czabaje